R.I.S, police scientifique is a French television series, created by Stéphane Kaminka in 2005, broadcast by TF1 since 2006. The R.I.S. in the title is an acronym for Recherches et Investigations Scientifiques, referring to the fictional police investigation unit that is the focus of the series. The series, a crime drama, is a remake of an Italian television series entitled RIS Delitti Imperfetti.

Plot summary

The Series follows team of crime lab experts who trying to solve crime. The Experts work with two detectives (from season 6 just one) and helps them to arrest suspects and gave them the evidence they need. There are five (in season 4 six and in season 5 seven) crime lab technicians. These experts are head of R.I.S Marc Venturi (seasons 1–2), Gilles Sagnac (seasons 3–6), Maxime Vernon (seasons 6-7) and Lucie Ballack (season 8). Under their command are technicians Hugo Chalonges (seasons 1–6), Malin Berkaoui, Nathalie Giesbert (seasons 1–5), Julie Labro (seasons 1–6), Frédéric Arthaud (seasons 4–8), Katia Schriver (seasons 5–7) and Émilie Durringer (seasons 6–8). Crime lab cooperate with medical expert dr. Alessandra Joffrin and with two detectives, captain Pierre Morand and lieutenant Martine Forest (seasons 1–5). Location of the series is in Paris, France.

Characters
 Jean-Pierre Michaël as Marc Venturi (2005–07, 09): Head of the R.I.S
 Philippe Caroit as Gilles Sagnac (2007–10): Head of the R.I.S
 Michel Voïta as Maxime Vernon (2011–12): Head of the R.I.S
 Delfinne Rollin as Lucie Ballak (2013–14): Head of the R.I.S 
 Pierre-Loup Rajot as Hugo Chalonges (2005–10)
 Stéphane Metzger as Malik Berkaoui (2005–14)
 Jean Luc Joseph as Frédéric Arthaud (2008–14)
 Aurélie Bargème as Nathalie Giesbert (2005–09)
 Anne Charlotte Pontabry as Katia Schriver (2009–12)
 Barbara Cabrita as Julie Labro (2005–11)
 Laetitia Fourcade as Émilie Durringer (2011–14)
 Coraly Zahonero as Docteur Alessandra Joffrin (2005–14)
 Laurent Olmedo as  Captain Pierre Morand (2005–14)
 Claudia Tagbo as Lieutenant Martine Forest (2005–09)

Main
Marc Venturi
Mark was the head of the R.I.S for first two seasons of the show. He was brief in relationship with Julie. He has a wife, who was kidnapped. And all the time he was boss he never stop looking for her. At the end of second season he resigned R.I.S and told Hugo that he found his wife and he is going to meet her. He returned once in season five to help the team to find a bomber. At the time he became a special adviser in the bomb-squad.

Hugo Chalonges
Hugo is expert in physics and chemistry. He is close friend to both Marc Venturi and Gilles Sagnac. He has a daughter Cécile, who is invalid. In season 6 Hugo faked his death with help of Gillas and Alessandra that he can investigate a fabric business where some women who worked there had a miscarriage, because they inhaled some gasses. Later team found out that he faked his death. They were shocked, especially Fred. At the end of the episode when Gilles was fired for his actions Hugo quit.

Malik Berkaoui
Malik is expert in ballistic. He was in romantic relationship with Julie and before her with Cécile, Hugo's daughter. In season 7 he was captured by Julie's killer and had a bomb on his chest. The team succeeded in freeing him. In season 9 he was in romantic relationship with a woman named Coralie "Lilou" Dumas. Later Lilou was murdered and killer framed him. Malik later escapes from police custody and go on revenge. He went on a roof across the flat of a killer and he wanted to kill him, but he changed his mind because he is not killer. At the end of the final season he left R.I.S to go on treatment, but he told Ballack that he will be back.

Nathalie Giesbert
Nathalie is expert in biology. She was on the show from season 1 to 5. At the beginning of season 5 she take Eloise on her first field assignment and left her in apartment to investigate. In apartment was gas leaking and later the flat exploded. Nathalie quit in episode 3 with feelings that she is responsible for Eloise's death.

Julie Labro
Julie is expert in electronic. She was in brief romantic relationship with Marc and in romantic relationship with Mailc. She was almost killed in season one while working on a device found on crime scene. The device exploded, but she make it. In season seven she was target of killer who blame her and Malik because they weren't properly investigate death of his wife and thought that are suicide. At the end of episode 1 the bomb exploded in Julie's apartment and Malik was trying to call her. In episode 2 Malik entered in her apartment and found her. She was driven to a hospital where she died.

Dr. Alessandra Joffrin
Alessandra is a medical examiner who works with team and provides them autopsies and CODs and TODs. In season 4 she was captured in refrigerator truck by a killer. The team found her when she was near the death. She took leave of absence of 4 episodes to recover herself. She return to the job in episode 6 of season 4. In season 8 she was in romantic relationship with Maurand and in season 9 they have a baby.

Pierre Maurand
Pierre is a police detective with the rank of captain. He was close friend to Marc and Gilles. In season 8 it is revealed that he is in romantic relationship with Alessandra. In season 9 they have a baby.

Martine Forest
Martine is a police detective with the rank of lieutenant. She also worked with team when they had a two crime scenes. She worked with one part and Maurand with the other part of the team. In season 5 she was wounded and she left to recovery herself. Claudia Tagbo was the only cast member to be promoted to the main cast and then demoted to recurring cast again. Martine is the only black women who worked in R.I.S

Gilles Sagnac
Gilles succeeded Marc Venturi on a position of the head of the R.I.S. Gilles was close friend to Hugo and Pierre. In season 6 he, Hugo and Alessandra faked Hugo's death to provide him investigation. At the end of episode 6 Gilles was fired from R.I.S.

Frédéric "Fred" Arthaud
Fred was lab technician and he was introduced at the beginning of season 4. He is closed friend to Mailk and Hugo. Fred is only black man who work in R.I.S. In season 9 he was almost killed with Gorgona virus, but he survived. In the same season he saved his girlfriend from the hands of rapist and killer who try to rape and kill her.

Dr. Gabriel Valmer
Dr. Valmer was medical examiner like Alessandra. He replaced her in four episodes of her absence when she recovering herself. When she returned he stayed on a position of ME and helped the team as the other ME. He was written out near the end of season 5 with no explanation for his departing.

Katia Schriver
Katia first appeared at the beginning of season 5 to help the team on a case they worked. When Nathalie left she joined the R.I.S team. She was written out at the end of season 8 with no explanation to her departing.

Maxime Vernon
Vernon is succeeded Sagnac on the position of the head of R.I.S in 7th episode of season 6. Vernon has the rank of commander. At the end of season 8 he is shot by a suspect who escape from the custody and took Émilie as a hostage. At the beginning of season 9 it is revealed that he did not survive and that he died from injures.

Émilie Durringer
Émilie replaced Julie in 3rd episode of season 7. She first help the R.I.S team on a case of murder and later joined the R.I.S team. In season 9 premiere she was taken as a hostage by suspect and buried in stone grave. In 2nd episode she is freed by the team. At first seemed that she died, but seconds later she opened her eyes. Later in season 9 she was almost killed by Gorgona virus like Fred, but she survived.

Lucie Ballack
Ballack succeeded Vernon on the position of the head of the R.I.S and she is the only women who was boss. She was frustrated when Émilie was kidnapped on her first day on the job, but with Alessandra's help she calmed down.

Recurring

Cécile Challonges (seasons 1–2,5-6)
Cécile (portrayed by Lizzie Brocheré) is Hugo's daughter. She is invalid. She was in brief romantic relationship with Malik. At the end of season 2 she left the country and went on operation. She returned in season 5 and it is revealed that operation succeeded and that she can walk now. She made her last appearance in season 6.

Eloise Soma (seasons 4-5)
Eloise (portrayed by Claire Galopin) is a lab technician like Fred. Her first field assignment was in season 5 premiere. She was alone in apartment on crime scene where gas was leaking. She collapsed, but the team did not notice that she is missing until couple hours later. Hugo, Malik and Nathalie returned to the crime scene but the apartment was on fire. Malik run in the building seconds before apartment exploded. She died before apartment exploded from the gas. Nathalie quit because Eloise's death.

Guest
 Adriana Karembeu as Krystel Regnier
 Eriq Ebouaney as The Campus President
 Fanny Sidney as Mathilde
 Françoise Bertin as Annette Dumas / Lucette
 Hugo Becker as Emmanuel
 Jean Dell as Lawyer Langevin
 Jean-Marie Bigard as Carrera
 Jonas Bloquet as Alexandre Bouvier
 Lannick Gautry as Stéphane
 Liane Foly as Monica Verone
 Linda Hardy as Lilou
 Marie-Christine Adam as Madame Duringer
 Marie-Hélène Lentini as Committee Member
 Samir Boitard as Karim Akdar
 Serge Riaboukine as Me Kalfan

Episodes

Differences from the original version
The series is rather similar to the original Italian version. Most of the episodes are remakes of episodes from the Italian version, with the settings of the episodes relocated to France and characters given French names, though the second season featured a few episodes with original plot lines.

The head of the French RIS, Marc Venturi, shares the last name with the head of the Italian RIS, Riccardo Venturi, but aside from that, none of the other names are the same.

See also
 RIS Delitti Imperfetti, the original Italian version
 R. I. S. – Die Sprache der Toten, the German remake of RIS Delitti Imperfetti
 List of French Adaptations of Television Series from Other Countries
 C.S.I.: Crime Scene Investigation

External links
  Fansite
  TF1 website for the series
 

French police procedural television series
2006 French television series debuts
French television series based on non-French television series
Television shows set in France
2014 French television series endings
TF1 original programming
Television shows set in Paris